Hot Springs High School may refer to:

 Hot Springs High School (Arkansas) listed on the NRHP in Hot Springs, Arkansas
 Hot Springs High School (Montana) in Hot Springs, Montana
 Hot Springs High School (New Mexico) in Hot Springs, New Mexico
 Hot Springs High School (South Dakota) in Hot Springs, South Dakota
 Hot Springs County High School in Thermopolis, Wyoming